Braganza is a holding company owned by Per G. Braathen and his immediate family. Based in Oslo, Norway, it has several major investments in the transport and tourism industry. Some of the largest investments include Kristiansand Zoo and Amusement Park and Braathens Regional Aviation, which owns three Swedish airlines: Golden Air, Malmö Aviation and Sverigeflyg.

The company was founded in 1938 by Ludvig G. Braathen and his shipping company, Ludvig G. Braathens Rederi. Until 1994 Braganza was the sole owner of Braathens SAFE, and held a partial ownership until 2001, when Norway's largest domestic airline was sold to the SAS Group for 1.1 billion Norwegian krone. The holding company has also previously owned Braathens Helikopter and Busy Bee.

References

External links
 Braganza.com

Holding companies of Norway
Holding companies established in 1938
Companies based in Oslo
Braathens
Airline holding companies
Transport companies established in 1938
Norwegian companies established in 1938